Iraq–Sweden relations are foreign relations between Iraq and Sweden. Iraq has an embassy in Stockholm, and a new Swedish embassy opened in Baghdad in 2009.

Sweden is one of the largest donors to the protection force for UN personnel in Iraq, that was established in 2004.

History
In 1903, Sweden began diplomatic relations with the then Ottoman Empire and a Swedish consulate was established.

In November 1934, the Crown Prince Gustaf Adolf and Crown Princess Margaret, Princess Ingrid and Prince Bertil visited Iraq. On 1 November they arrived in Baghdad. King Ghazi of Iraq met at his country house Kasr-el-Zuhoor, from where he accompanied his guests to Bilatt Castle, where they were invited to take up residence. At all the official events that followed, except for King Ghazi, his uncle and father-in-law, King Ali of Hejaz, the President of the Council and members of the Cabinet, the President of the Senate and others. On 6 November, the royals left by train for Khanaqin for further transport to Tehran. On 25 November the return trip to Baghdad began over the snowy passes along the Kum-Sultanabad-Kermanshah road. After a week-long unofficial stay in Baghdad with visits to modern factories and excursions to Ur and Babylon, the Crown Prince and Princess Ingrid left for Damascus on 5 December.

Sweden has had diplomatic relations with Iraq since 1960.

Trade 
Sweden has for many years had established trade relations with Iraq. During the 1980s, several large Swedish companies were present in Iraq. Many Swedish companies have hence good knowledge about the Iraqi market, and have a good reputation in the area.

The Swedish export to Iraq has during the last years mainly contained engineering products. The export to Iraq was almost SEK 444 million in 2008, of which SEK 384 million were engineering products. The Swedish import from Iraq has increased from low levels of earlier years and was about SEK 9 million in 2008.

Iraqi refugees 
Since 2003, 36,700 Iraqis have applied for asylum in Sweden. The peak year was 2007 with 18,600 applications. About 50 per cent of all asylum applications from Iraqis to European countries in 2006 and 2007 were made in Sweden. Since 2003, about 38,000 Iraqis have been granted a residence permit in Sweden; more than 20,000 of these were granted after an application for asylum, more than 15,000 for the purpose of family reunion and over 1,000 for resettlement.

See also 
 Foreign relations of Iraq
 Foreign relations of Sweden
 Iraqis in Sweden
 Iraq–European Union relations
 Kurdistan Region–Sweden relations

References

External links 
Iraq embassy in Stockholm
Embassy of Sweden for Iraq in Amman, Jordan

 
Sweden
Bilateral relations of Sweden